Canyon Country is a neighborhood in the eastern part of the city of Santa Clarita, in northwestern Los Angeles County, California, United States. It lies along the Santa Clara River between the Sierra Pelona Mountains and the San Gabriel Mountains. It is the most populous of Santa Clarita's four neighborhoods.

History
The area was the ancestral homeland of the Tataviam people for over five hundred years, and other tribes before then, such as the Tongva, Kitanemuk, and Serrano people. After Spanish settlement, the valley became grazing lands of the Mission San Fernando Rey de España around 1790. In 1834, after Mexican independence, it became part of the Rancho San Francisco land grant centered on the confluence of the Santa Clara River and Castaic Creek.

In the 1880s, the rancho become the Newhall Ranch empire of Henry Newhall, from which his family started the Newhall Land and Farming Company after his death. In 1928, the St. Francis Dam collapsed, suddenly flooding and washing away settlements and people along the Santa Clara River section of present-day Santa Clarita not including Canyon Country. Canyon Country was originally to be called Solemint. It later absorbed the community to the west called Honby. In the 1960s and 1970s, the Newhall Land company's suburban developments transformed Canyon Country and the surrounding towns into a largely residential city.

In 1987, Canyon Country was one of four communities, along with Valencia, Newhall, and Saugus, that merged to create the city of Santa Clarita, California.

Geography
Canyon Country is located on the east side of Santa Clarita, along the Santa Clara River. It occupies roughly the portion of Santa Clarita east of Golden Valley Road, and is bordered by Saugus to the west and Newhall to the southwest. The Sierra Pelona Mountains lie north of the community, and the San Gabriel Mountains lie to the south and east. Both ranges are part of the Angeles National Forest.

Canyon Country lies primarily within ZIP codes 91351 and 91387. The boundary between the two ZIP codes mostly follows Sierra Highway - addresses west of or along the highway are in 91351, while addresses east of the highway are in 91387. ZIP codes 91321, 91350, and 91390 also include small portions of Canyon Country.

Due to its location adjacent to the mountainous Angeles National Forest, and its aridity (especially in summer), Canyon Country is susceptible to wildfires. The Buckweed Fire in October 2007 burned nearly  throughout Canyon Country and Agua Dulce.

Demographics

As of the 2020 census, the population of Canyon Country was 92,897. 41.7% of residents were Hispanic, 36.7% were non-Hispanic white, 13.9% were Asian American, 7.4% were African American, and 3.1% were Native American.

Education
Canyon Country elementary school students attend schools in Saugus Union School District and Sulphur Springs School District.

Middle and high school students in Canyon Country attend schools in William S. Hart Union High School District, in particular Sierra Vista and La Mesa Junior High Schools, and Canyon and Golden Valley High Schools.

Santa Clarita Christian School is located in Canyon Country. College of the Canyons has a satellite campus in Canyon Country in addition to its main campus in Valencia. Charter College has a campus in Canyon Country, one of three campuses in California (the others are in Lancaster and Oxnard).

Services
Canyon Country is served by the Los Angeles County Sheriff's Department and Los Angeles County Fire Department. The fire stations serving Canyon Country are 104, 107, 123, 128, 132, and 150.

Parks and recreation

Canyon Country is served by the park system of the city of Santa Clarita. Parks in Canyon Country include Canyon Country Park (the largest), North Oaks Park, Discovery Park, Todd Longshore Park, Fair Oaks Park, Oak Spring Canyon Park, and Begonias Lane Park. The city's newest park, Plum Canyon Park, is located in northern Canyon Country on the border with Saugus.

The George A. Caravalho Santa Clarita Sports Complex in far western Canyon Country includes a gymnasium with two indoor, full-sized basketball courts, four pickleball courts, two volleyball courts, two futsal courts, and four racquetball courts. The Sports Complex includes the City of Santa Clarita Activities Center (a.k.a. The Centre) which contains rooms for banquets and meetings. Adjacent to the Sports Complex is the Santa Clarita Aquatic Center, which includes three large swimming pools and several water slides; the Trek Bike Park of Santa Clarita (opened September 2020) covering 7 acres including BMX and mountain biking trails; and the Santa Clarita Skate Park. Many city-sponsored recreational programs are held at the Sports Complex and adjacent facilities. It is located along Centre Pointe Parkway just east of Golden Valley Road.

In popular culture
The house of The Crandall family used in the movie Don't Tell Mom the Babysitter's Dead is located in this community. A home here was also featured in the climax of Real Genius, but it no longer exists.

See also
Sand Canyon (part of Canyon Country)
Lang Southern Pacific Station, a California Historic Landmark

References

External links

Neighborhoods in Santa Clarita, California